Pradani Muthirulappa Pillai (or Muthu Irulappa Pillai), son of Sundra Pandya Pillai, of the 18th century was a minister of Ramnad during the reign of Muthuramalinga Sethupathy. As the king was a minor, just an infant, the pradani took over the controls of a languishing kingdom and brought order and a sense of well-being by his careful planning and introduction of several tax and revenue reforms. Due to ideological differences that arose between the king and himself, he was forced to retire from his position in disgrace, was labelled as a traitor of India, and was forgotten. The Ramnad Manual amply records his administrative prowess and tax reforms.

The Period
The last few decades of the 18th century were a troubled period in the history of India, and in the history of the kingdom of Ramnad in particular. In this period, the Marava chieftains resisted the suzerainty of the Muslim Nawab of Arcot.  The Nawab responded by giving the Ramnad Estate the status of a tributary landlord with a tribute of 175,000 rupees, thus quelling the unrest of the Maravas.

As the incumbent Sethupathi of Ramnad was an infant, three Pradanis were appointed as regents.  The three Pradanis thus appointed were Muthia Pillai, Vellu Pillai and Sankaran Pillai.  The three Pradanis, having no oversight from the Sethupathi, acted in their personal interested and neglected the affairs of state.  The next Pradani, Muthirulappa Pillai, took sole charge of the administration.

Governance for The People
It was at this difficult juncture that Pradani Muthirulappa Pillai took control of the kingdom.  He was not a starry-eyed idealist. His mission was to make Ramnad strong and her people comfortable. He had to pay tribute to the Nawab. Shrewd statesman that he was, he realised that while he paid his tributes, he must also keep the British happy for the Nawab was no more than a puppet on their stings.

The quote from the Gazetteer of India continues thus: "He realized that he should placate the British in order to bring effective internal reforms, since the British were having the leading strings of the Nawab in their hands."

More information about this minister can be found in the Ramnad Manual that can be accessed in the Tamil Nadu Government Archives.
It has this to say: "This Pradani had the direction of everything. Unlike his predecessors, it was his firm belief that the best chance of improvement of the country was by internal reform and a hearty cooperation with the British who were now becoming the virtual rulers of the Karnatic. He paid the tribute punctually. He improved the revenue and account system of the country as will be noticed in its proper place. He built several chattrams along the main roads of the pilgrimage. Roads were opened through the forests. Immense sums were spent on the restoration of the Pagodas which were falling into ruins, the splendid Chockattan Mantapam or the cloistered precincts of the temple at Rameshwaram being finally completed by this minister ..."

In 1789, he undertook a study about a possible supply of water to the Vaigai River from the Periyar River. Nothing was done about it at the time due to a paucity of funds. Over a century later, the British implemented his plan as the Mullaperiyar Dam in 1895.

Clashing Perspectives
When the child king grew up, being young, he could not discern his minister’s worth. There developed between them an ideological conflict too wide to bridge. The older and more experienced pradani felt that Ramnad ought to take a pragmatic approach and ought not to rise up against the British at that point of time. The younger Sethupathy was determined to bravely fight the British, caught up as he was with the heady struggle of the freedom movement.

Page 244 of the Ramnad Manual says: "In 1792, Ramnad country was ceded by treaty to the British Government who sent Colonel Martinz with English force to occupy the country which was considered rebellious and troublesome and to levy the annual tribute punctually from the Setupathy. He came and settled in the heart of the town occupying a bungalow, which still exists, on the bank of the Mugavai Urani, and bears the name Colonel 'Bungalow'. The stout Colonel's likeness in the stiff military dress of the period is depicted on the walls of the hall of installation in the palace, viz "Ramalinga Vilasam". He has behind him two young officers also in military dress. Facing them all, sits the Sethupathy with his consort. Behind the Sethupathy's chair stands the great minister Muthirulappa Pillai who was on intimate terms with the Colonel."

This painting can be seen in the Ramnad palace, Ramalingavilasam, even to this day. Shortly after this period, the pradani was dismissed in disgrace.

From the Ramnad Manual: "It is said that the minister became very proud and arrogant as his intimacy with the Colonel increased. The Sethupathy was in consequence obliged to dismiss him in favor of his rival Muthukumaru Pillai. The dismissed minister appears to have gone and resided at Madura as the "Renter" of the British Revenue."

The young King Muthuramalinga Sethupathy courageously challenged the British who deposed him in 1795. (Shortly after that, in 1803, the East India Company reduced Ramnad to a zamindari.) He was thus the last of the Sethupathy kings of the Ramnad kingdom. The other noteworthy kings were Thirumala Sethupathy under whose reign the kingdom expanded and grew, Kilavan Sethupathy who built the palace in Ramnad, and Muthu Vijayaraghunatha Sethupathy.

References

1. Ramaswami, Dr A. Gazetteer of India, Tamil Nadu State Ramanathapuram District

2. Rao, MT Raja Ram. Ramnad Manual (Madras, 1892) Pg. 7, 120-121, 167, 243-244, 248, 270, 287-290, 292-293, 295, 298-300, 306, 336-477

External links
Painting of the temple and sketches of the entrance 
Sketch of Rameshwaram during this period 

Indian Tamil politicians